Kapa haka is the term for Māori action songs and the groups who perform them. The phrase translates to 'group' 'dance'. Kapa haka is an important avenue for Māori people to express and showcase their heritage and cultural Polynesian identity through song and dance.

There is a regular national kapa haka competition currently called Te Matatini that has been running since 1972. 

A kapa haka performance involves choral singing, dance and movements associated with the hand-to-hand combat practised by Māori in mainly precolonial times, presented in a synchronisation of action, timing, posture, footwork and sound. The genre evolved out of a combination of European and Māori musical principles. The current form relates to kapa haka concert groups that first appeared in the 1860s especially in Rotorua to cater to tourists.

Performance 
The work of a kapa haka consists of the group performance of a suite of songs and dances spanning several types of Māori music and dance, strung together into a coherent whole. They may also include  (synchronised manipulation of thin sticks). In a full performance, which can last up to 40 minutes, each music or dance type may appear more than once.

Music for kapa haka is primarily vocal. All song types, with the notable exceptions of mōteatea and haka, are structured around European-style harmony, frequently with guitar accompaniment and acoustics. Spurts of haka-style declamation are woven into the songs, as are dance movements, facial expressions and other bodily and aural signals unique to Māori. Song poetry is completely in Māori and new material is continually being composed.

Kapa haka are mixed groups of anywhere between several and dozens of people, that may or may not wear a costume. These groups comprise individuals linked in some way, be it by extended family group,  (tribe), school, or some other association. Performers are largely synchronised, but with men sometimes doing some actions while women do others. Composers, arrangers, choreographers and costume designers also play major roles.

Every two years, kapa haka performers from all parts of New Zealand compete in Te Matatini, New Zealand's annual, national Māori performing arts competition for adult groups. Another important competition takes place yearly at the ASB Bank Auckland Secondary Schools Māori and Pacific Islands Cultural Festival, commonly known as Polyfest, where the level of performance is also very high.

Music and dance styles used by kapa haka 

Not all Māori performance types are used by kapa haka. Below are brief descriptions of the ones that usually appear. See Māori music for a wider discussion of Māori music.

 are choral pieces used to warm up the vocal cords and introduce the group to the audience. Through a  the group announces its arrival in a manner that is generally light and positive.
 are also choral pieces. They are frequently used to comment on a social issue of the day or to commemorate an individual or some element of Māoridom. They may also simply be used as the entrance song to announce the group's arrival.
 are best described as challenges. They are used to make a point, honor someone/something, tell a story or express an emotion. They are performed by both men and women, with the focus on the men in the front and support from the women behind. They are vocal performances involving rhythmic declamation in triple metre and aggressive or challenging facial expressions (literally "glaring"), body movements and demeanour. The men make heavy use of foot stamping, body percussion, and grimace in an attempt to appear as menacing as possible. Haka are often described as traditional war dances but in fact had many other uses as well in precolonial Māori society, and have many peaceful uses today.
 (literally "song of hands or arms") are "action songs", which means that they display the typical Polynesian practice of embellishing and reinforcing the sung poetry with arm and hand actions. They are performed by men and women with women in the front and men in the back. Some use melodies from common English-language songs with new lyrics in Māori, while others are newly composed, treating a wide variety of topics.
 are women's dances involving the swinging of balls, about the size of tennis balls, attached to cords. Poi's origins lie in the precolonial practice of training with poi to improve agility in battle, but today poi is used to showcase the beauty and gracefulness of the women. Poi were traditionally used by women on long  voyages as a means of keeping timing of the male paddlers, in the style of a coxswain. This is the reason for the emphasis of the sound of the poi striking the hand. Performers swing the balls in synchrony in a variety of figures and rhythms while simultaneously singing a song (a ) accompanied by guitar. They demonstrate great dexterity and coordination, particularly with "long poi", with cords up to a metre long, where four poi at once may be manipulated by each performer. The sound of poi striking the hands is an important part of the musical accompaniment.
 are occasionally used by kapa haka.  are pairs of carved thin sticks about shoulder width manipulated with dextrous wrist and arm work, often simultaneously passed between performers. Like poi, tītī tōrea figures are performed in synchrony and to music (and like poi, their sounds, especially that of the ends hitting the floor together, form a percussive accompaniment); and, also like poi, arose out of a precolonial warrior training technique.
They are an important genre within Maoridom because they tell stories in which historical, genealogical and cultural information is preserved and thus link Māori with their past.  come in a variety of forms including laments, lullabies, and songs about revenge, anger, and love.
 are choral pieces used to farewell the audience or make a final point before departing the stage. Performers are often at the side or back of the stage.

References

External links 

 Maori.org kapa haka page
Research in New Zealand Performing Arts - a free online research journal that discusses contemporary kapa haka and related Maori performing arts.
 New Zealand Post Kaumātua Kapa Haka Slideshow of images from the 2014 New Zealand Post Kaumātua Kapa Haka, Te Papa Channel

New Zealand styles of music
Māori words and phrases
Māori culture
Haka
Māori festivals